Andaya is a surname. Notable people with the surname include:

Barbara Watson Andaya (born 1943), Australian historian and author
Mark Andaya (born 1981), Filipino basketball player
Marissa Mercado-Andaya (19692020), Filipina politician
Rolando Andaya Jr. (19692022), Filipino lawyer and politician